A mixed-grass prairie is an ecotone located between the tallgrass prairies and shortgrass prairies. The mixed-grass prairie is richer in ecological diversity than either the tall- or shortgrass prairie. The mixed-grass prairie occurs in the central plains portion of the Great Plains, varying in width from central Texas in the United States up into southeastern Manitoba, Alberta and Saskatchewan in the northern mixed grasslands of Canada.

See also

References

External links
 
  
 
 
 

+
Physiographic provinces
Regions of the Western United States